The 1947 Wisconsin earthquake took place on May 6, immediately south of Milwaukee at 15:25 (CST).  It was the largest tremor to be historically documented in Wisconsin, but was not recorded by seismographs.

History 
The area had been previously shaken by the 1909 Wabash River earthquake, causing damage assessed at VII (Very strong) on the Modified Mercalli scale across the Wisconsin-Illinois border. Two earthquakes were also reported in the state in 1912. Shocks in 1919 and 1925, the first from Missouri and the latter from Canada, occurred over enormous zones and affected the entire region, though not seriously. Earthquakes struck Wisconsin again in 1937 and 1939.

Damage 
Damage consisted of broken windows and fallen porcelain, pots and dishes. The locals' initial impression was that an explosion had taken place. Many evacuated buildings into the streets. Corporate office buildings were emptied of workers. Numerous calls were made local fire departments, police stations and newspapers. Three reports were made to the Milwaukee Fire Department, all describing explosions.

Often described as "sharp", this was the most powerful earthquake to date in Wisconsin's seismological history. The earthquake broke a seismograph at Marquette University. Many hotels, such as the Schroeder Hotel in Milwaukee, were rocked by the tremor. However, the earthquake caused no serious damage or casualties.

See also
 List of earthquakes in 1947
 List of earthquakes in the United States

References

Further reading
 

Wisconsin Earthquake, 1947
Wisconsin Earthquake, 1947
Earthquakes in Wisconsin
1947 natural disasters in the United States